Mohan Lal Grero is a Sri Lankan educationist and politician. He is a member of the Parliament of Sri Lanka representing the Colombo District and he is the current State Minister of University Education. He was elected as an opposition United National Party member of parliament but crossed over to the ruling United People's Freedom Alliance in November 2011. He is the founder of the Lyceum International School.

Education
He received his primary education from Royal Preparatory School and moved to Ananda College for secondary education in 1966. In 1974 he entered the Katubedda Campus of the University of Sri Lanka and graduated in 1980 with an honours degree in engineering. In 1986 he gained his Pilot's license and gained an Executive Diploma in Business Administration from the University of Colombo, winning the Professor Linus de Silva challenge Gold Medal.

References

External links
Mohan Lal Grero Foundation

Living people
Sri Lankan educational theorists
United National Party politicians
Sri Lankan Buddhists
Alumni of Ananda College
Alumni of Royal Preparatory School
Members of the Western Provincial Council
Members of the 14th Parliament of Sri Lanka
Members of the 15th Parliament of Sri Lanka
Sinhalese politicians
Year of birth missing (living people)